Sap is a village and municipality in the Dunajská Streda District in the Trnava Region of south-west Slovakia. The outlet channel of the Gabčíkovo – Nagymaros Dams re-enters the Danube at the village.

History
The village was first recorded in 1255 as Zap.  Until the end of World War I, it was part of Hungary and fell within the Tószigetcsilizköz district of Győr County. After the Austro-Hungarian army disintegrated in November 1918, Czechoslovak troops occupied the area. After the Treaty of Trianon of 1920, the village became officially part of Czechoslovakia. In November 1938, the First Vienna Award granted the area to Hungary and it was held by Hungary until 1945. After Soviet occupation in 1945, Czechoslovak administration returned and the village became officially part of Czechoslovakia in 1947. In 1948, Czechoslovak authorities renamed the village  for Palkovičovo and its historical name was restored only in 1990.

Demography 
In 1910, the village had 645, for the most part, Hungarian inhabitants. At the 2001 Census the recorded population of the village was 540 while an end-2008 estimate by the Statistical Office had the villages's population as 550. As of 2001, 96,30 per cent of its population was Hungarian while 2,41 per cent was Slovak.

As of 2001, 58,52% of the inhabitants professed Roman Catholicism.

References

External links

Flag and Coat of Arms
Mayor Office's info 

Villages and municipalities in Dunajská Streda District
Hungarian communities in Slovakia